Brett Ratner (born March 28, 1969) is an American film director and producer. He directed the Rush Hour film series, The Family Man, Red Dragon, X-Men: The Last Stand, and Tower Heist. He is also a producer of several films, including the Horrible Bosses series, The Revenant and War Dogs.

Ratner got his start directing with music videos in the 1990s, and directed his first motion picture, Money Talks, in 1997. Overall, the films Ratner has directed have earned over $2 billion at the global box office. Ratner is the co-founder of RatPac Entertainment, a film production company. Ratner led RatPac's partnership with Dune Entertainment in September 2013 for a co-producing deal with Warner Bros. that included 75 films. RatPac Entertainment has co-financed 81 theatrically released motion pictures exceeding $17 billion in worldwide box office receipts. RatPac’s co-financed films have been nominated for 59 Academy Awards, 25 Golden Globes and 43 BAFTAs and have won 25 Academy Awards, 8 Golden Globes and 24 BAFTAs. In January 2017, Ratner received a star on the Hollywood Walk of Fame for his contributions to the motion picture industry, located at 6801 Hollywood Boulevard.

Early life
Ratner was born and raised in Miami Beach, Florida, the son of Marsha Presman and Ronald Ratner.  He grew up in a "middle-class Jewish family".

His grandfather was d-CON mail order rat poison company founder and real estate developer Lee Ratner. His mother was born in Cuba, and immigrated to the U.S. in the 1960s with her parents, Fanita and Mario Presman (their families had originally moved to Cuba from Eastern Europe).

Ratner's mother was sixteen when he was born. Ratner has said that he "really didn't know" his biological father, and that he considers Alvin Malnik, a lawyer and businessman with alleged organized crime ties who opened the famous Forge restaurant in Miami Beach, to be his father, "the one who raised" him. Malnik was a friend of Lee Ratner and not romantically involved with Marsha Presman.

Ratner's biological father became homeless in Miami Beach, a situation which inspired the younger Ratner to become a board member of the nationwide nonprofit organization Chrysalis, which helps the homeless find work.

Ratner attended Rabbi Alexander S. Gross Hebrew Academy elementary school and attended Alexander Muss High School in Israel and graduated in 1986 from Miami Beach Senior High School. While growing up in Miami Beach, Ratner was an extra on the set of Scarface and was able to watch Miami Vice film around town. Shortly before Ratner's high school graduation, his mother and biological father married with the intention of legitimating his status.

He is a 1990 graduate of New York University. In 2010, he cited Martin Scorsese's 1980 film Raging Bull as his inspiration to enter the world of film.

Career

Directing
Ratner began directing music videos in the 1990s. When he was a sophomore at New York University Tisch Schools of the Arts, he was manager and executive producer for B.M.O.C. (Big Man On Campus), one of the first white rap groups. While a student at NYU, he released his first short film Whatever Happened to Mason Reese?. The rap group Public Enemy attended the film's premiere and asked Ratner to make the group's music videos. Ratner did the debut videos for Prime Minister Pete Nice before working with Redman, LL Cool J, Heavy D and Wu-Tang Clan. He has also directed music videos for artists such as Mariah Carey Madonna, Miley Cyrus, Jay-Z and was scheduled to direct a video for Michael Jackson before its production was cancelled. He directed Carey's "We Belong Together", "I Still Believe", "Obsessed" and "Heartbreaker" among others.

Ratner had his motion picture debut when he directed Money Talks in 1997. The film, an action-comedy about a con-man accused of organizing a prison break, was Ratner's first collaboration with comedian Chris Tucker. The film's budget was $25 million.

In 1998, he directed Rush Hour, the action-comedy starring Jackie Chan and Chris Tucker, which was released in September 1998 and went on to become the studio's highest-grossing film and the highest grossing comedy at the time.  Ratner uses music on the set to inspire the production, and when filming Rush Hour, a Michael Jackson song he played for inspiration ended up in the movie after Chris Tucker began dancing in the middle of a scene.

Ratner directed The Family Man, a drama starring Nicolas Cage, in 2000.

In 2001, Ratner directed Rush Hour 2. In 2002, he directed the prequel to Silence of the Lambs, Red Dragon, about Hannibal Lecter.

In 2004, Ratner directed After the Sunset, starring Pierce Brosnan and Salma Hayek. The action comedy film revolves around a master thief pulling off one last big score, with an FBI agent in hot pursuit.

In 2006, Ratner directed X-Men: The Last Stand, then directed Rush Hour 3, which was released in 2007.

Ratner directed a television commercial for Wynn Las Vegas featuring Steve Wynn on top of Encore Las Vegas in 2008.

In the same year, Ratner also directed the ensemble comedy caper Tower Heist, starring Ben Stiller and Eddie Murphy. The film was originally based on an idea from Eddie Murphy titled 'Trump Heist' and was about disgruntled employees of Donald Trump planning to rob Trump Tower, though references to Trump were later removed from the film.

In early 2021, Ratner announced that he will direct a long-gestated Milli Vanilli biopic, which would be his first project since 2014's Hercules, for Millennium Media. In February 2021, Millennium Media stated it would not be moving forward with Ratner's project.

Producing
Ratner was an executive producer of the television series Prison Break, which aired from 2005 to 2009.

In 2011, Ratner produced the TV documentary, American Masters: Woody Allen – A Documentary. That same year, he produced Horrible Bosses, a comedy about employees plotting to kill their bosses. Horrible Bosses opened at the domestic box office with $28.1 million in its first weekend.

Ratner produced a remake of Snow White, Mirror Mirror (2012), based on the screenplay The Brothers Grimm: Snow White by Melisa Wallack.

In 2014, he produced Horrible Bosses 2, the sequel to his 2011 film. Ratner executive-produced the Rush Hour TV series based on the Rush Hour film series.

In 2015, Ratner produced Black Mass, a biopic about gangster James "Whitey" Bulger, played by Johnny Depp. The same year, Ratner was executive producer of The Revenant, starring Leonardo DiCaprio.

He was an executive producer on the 2016 film War Dogs, directed by Todd Phillips and starring Jonah Hill and Miles Teller.

RatPac Entertainment
In December 2012, Ratner and Australian media mogul James Packer formed a joint venture, RatPac Entertainment. The firm will produce independent films and co-produce big-budget films with a major studio. Packer's stake in the company was later bought out by Len Blavatnik's First Access Entertainment. The company makes 25 films annually. By 2017, the company co-financed over 50 films which had 51 Oscar nominations and earned a total of over $10 billion in box office.

RatPac and Dune Entertainment formed a film investment vehicle, which in September 2013, entered a multi-year, 75-film co-producing partnership with Warner Bros. The company has also partnered with New Regency, advertising firm WPP, Chinese firm CMC Capital Partners, and Shanghai Media Group. Ratner worked with CMC to form a fund aimed at investments in Chinese media companies.

Ratner made $40 million after the release of Gravity, which was RatPac's first investment.

In June 2014, Ratner's RatPac Entertainment and Class 5 Films acquired the movie rights to the non-fiction article "American Hippopotamus", by Jon Mooallem, about the meat shortage in the U.S. in 1910 to import hippopotamuses. The film was produced by Ratner in collaboration with Edward Norton and William Migliore.

On April 18, 2017, Access Entertainment, a subsidiary of Access Industries, acquired James Packer's ownership stake in RatPac. The next year, Warner Bros. announced that they were cutting ties with the company after Brett Ratner's sexual harassment allegations with Rampage as the final film to be co-financed by the company with Warner Bros., and also the final film produced by RatPac overall. In November 2018, RatPac-Dune's minority ownership stake in a library of 76 Warner Bros. films was put up for sale, with investors in the fund backing the library to cash out. Vine Alternative Investments made a high bid for the library, but in January 2019, Warner Bros. exercised their rights to match the bid for the library and essentially acquired RatPac-Dune's stakes. The cost was estimated at nearly $300 million.

Screen appearances
Ratner was seen on MTV series Punk'd when Hugh Jackman, who portrays Wolverine in the X-Men films, was the subject of a practical joke that made it appear Ratner's $3.6 million home in Beverly Hills was destroyed by a BBQ grill explosion. Ashton Kutcher later arrived at his home and hugged him.

In April 2007, Fox announced that he, Carrie Fisher, Garry Marshall and Jon Avnet would be the judges for the network's filmmaking-competition/reality TV series, On the Lot.

He also appeared as himself in an episode of the television series Entourage, which was shot at his Beverly Hills home,

In 2009, Ratner created The Shooter Series which compiled his work, including interviews with Ratner, and a short film about Mickey Rourke's transition into boxing.

Other projects
In 2009, Ratner established Rat Press, a publishing company. The company reissued a Playboy interview with Marlon Brando and Robert Evans as well as an account of NFL player Jim Brown, and released a book of Scott Caan's photographs.

In 2011, Ratner established Rat TV with 20th Century Fox Television. He brought former NBC development executive Chris Conti on as president of the venture.

Ratner announced the Brett Ratner Florida Student Filmmaker Scholarship at the Key West Film Festival in 2015. The $5,000 scholarship was awarded to The Cook, The Knife and The Rabbit's Finger, which was directed by Agustina Bonventura and Nicolas Casanas.

Ratner worked with international beverage brand Diageo to produce The Hilhaven Lodge, a blended whiskey named for his Beverly Hills estate. The bottle is modeled after the estate and features a wood cork, and the bottle is shaped to resemble bay windows. The drink is a mixture of 26-year-old rye, 15-year-old Tennessee whiskey, and six-year bourbon.

Ratner delivered a keynote address as part of the Cannes Film Festival in May 2017 where he referred to television as the future of production. Ratner participated in the eighth annual Cannes Film Finance Forum.

In March 2017, Ratner spoke out against film critic aggregation site Rotten Tomatoes at the Sun Valley Film Festival, calling it a destructive force in the film industry. He expressed respect for traditional film critics and said the site reduces film criticism to a number.

Ratner has served on the boards of the Simon Wiesenthal Center and Museum of Tolerance,
Chrysalis, Ghetto Film School, Best Buddies and the Los Angeles Police Foundation. He served on the dean's council of NYU Tisch School of the Arts and also serves on the board of directors of Tel Aviv University's School of Film and Television. He donated $1 million to the Academy Museum of Motion Pictures in 2013.

Controversies

84th Academy Awards
On August 4, 2011, the Academy of Motion Picture Arts and Sciences announced Ratner would produce the 84th Academy Awards with Don Mischer. However, Ratner resigned on November 8, 2011, after remarking that "rehearsal is for fags". Ratner later apologized for his remarks. Eddie Murphy, who was scheduled to host the ceremony, also resigned in deference to a new production team. Ratner was replaced by Brian Grazer, and Murphy was replaced by previous Oscar host Billy Crystal.

Sexual assault allegations 
In October 2017, during the Me Too movement, a former talent agency employee accused Ratner of rape. On November 1, 2017, six women, including Olivia Munn and Natasha Henstridge, accused Ratner of sexual assault and harassment, as well as following an actress into a bathroom without invitation and masturbating as another entered his trailer to deliver food. The same month, actor Elliot Page accused Ratner of sexual harassment and outing the then 18-year-old Page as gay (before Page began identifying as male), in front of many onlookers including Anna Paquin, who later confirmed the story. A former fashion model came forward regarding an incident involving Russell Simmons and Ratner back in 1991, when Simmons coerced her to perform oral sex while Ratner was present.

On November 1, 2017, the same day as the allegations of six women, Warner Bros. announced it had severed ties with Ratner. Afterwards, Ratner announced that he was "[stepping] away from all Warner Bros.-related activities" and Warner Bros. was reviewing the issue.

In April 2018, Warner Bros. announced that they would not renew their $450-million co-producing deal with RatPac.

Ratner was one of the people featured in the text leak between himself, Charlotte Kirk, Kevin Tsujihara, and James Packer.

Book
Brendan Fraser stated in a 2018 interview with GQ that Ratner seemed to mislead him into posing for pictures with the intent of selling them as part of Ratner's planned book, Hilhaven Lodge: The Photo Booth Pictures. Fraser states that he was never asked and never gave permission for said photos to be used in the published book.

Filmography

Film

Short film
Director

Executive producer
 Velocity Rules (2001)
 Me and Daphne (2002)
 Kill Them Mommy! (2015)

Producer

Documentary films
{| style="width:100%;"
|- style="vertical-align:top;"
| width="50%" |
Producer
 ''Before, During and 'After the Sunset (2005) (Video)
 Night Will Fall (2014)
 Electric Boogaloo: The Wild,Untold Story of Cannon Films (2014)
 One Day Since Yesterday:Peter Bogdanovich & the Lost American Film (2014)
 Chuck Norris vs. Communism (2015)
 S is for Stanley (2015)
 In the Name of Honor (2015)
 Before the Flood (2016)
 Author: The J.T. Leroy Story (2016)

| width="50%" |Executive producer Catfish (2010)
 By Sidney Lumet (2015)
| width="50%" |
|}

TelevisionTV moviesTV series'''

Music video

References

External links

 
 Brett Ratner Cover Story Interview with Aventura Business Monthly
 Brett Ratner Producer Profile for The 1 Second Film
 New York Film Academy School of Film and Acting

 
1969 births
American book publishers (people)
American magazine publishers (people)
American music video directors
American people of Cuban-Jewish descent
Businesspeople from Miami
Film directors from Florida
Living people
Miami Beach Senior High School alumni
Tisch School of the Arts alumni
Hispanic and Latino American film directors
Hispanic and Latino American entertainers
Jewish American entertainers
Jewish American film producers
LGBT-related controversies in film